Gwaneumsa (관음사) is a Buddhist temple of the Jogye Order in Seoul, South Korea. Believed to have been established in 895, it is located in 519-3 Namhyeon-dong in the Gwanak District of the city.

See also
List of Buddhist temples in Seoul

External links
www.kwaneumsa.net - Official web site (in Korean)
koreatemple.net

Buddhist temples in Seoul
Gwanak District
Buddhist temples of the Jogye Order
9th-century establishments in Korea
9th-century Buddhist temples
Religious buildings and structures completed in 895

ko:관음사